Phratochronis is an extinct genus of chroniosuchid reptiliomorph from upper Permian (upper Roadian age) mudstone deposits of Dashankou locality, Xidagou Formation of China. It was first named by Jin-Ling Li and Zheng-Wu Cheng in 1999, from a maxilla and premaxilla with almost complete dentition (IGCAGS V 364). The type species is Phratochronis qilianensis. The generic name means “brothers of a clan” ( in Greek) + “late” in reference to its taxonomic position, and the specific name referring to the chain of mountains where the type specimen was found.

References

Chroniosuchians
Permian tetrapods
Prehistoric tetrapod genera
Fossil taxa described in 1999
Permian animals of Asia